Marvin Ogunsipe (born February 26, 1996) is an Austrian professional basketball player for CB Almansa, of the Spanish second division LEB Oro. He has held German citizenship since 2018.

Professional career
Before signing with Bayern Munich in 2014, Ogunsipe played with Vienna DC Timberwolves. Ogunsipe made his debut for Bayern on February 12, 2017, in a 56–80 win against Alba Berlin in which he scored 2 points.

Ogunsipe was sent on loan to the Hamburg Towers for the 2019–20 season. On May 11, 2020, he was loaned to Crailsheim Merlins for 2019–20 season playoffs. On August 17, 2020, he was loaned again to Hamburg Towers for one more year.

On July 9, 2021, Bayern Munich announced that Marvin Ogunsipe would return to Bayern München after his years on loan. He would play rarely however, and for the start of the new season, moved to CB Almansa.

References

1996 births
Living people
Austrian men's basketball players
Austrian people of Nigerian descent
Crailsheim Merlins players
FC Bayern Munich basketball players
Forwards (basketball)
Hamburg Towers players
Sportspeople from Vienna